The Window Cliffs State Natural Area covers  in Putnam County, Tennessee, near Cookeville. The Window Cliffs is the name of a prominent group of natural bridges in a narrow  ridge in the neck of a meander of Cane Creek. The day-use area is only accessible by hiking a  trail. The Window Cliffs was an acclaimed destination in the nineteenth and early twentieth centuries. The area contains several state-listed endangered plants.

It is the newest addition to Tennessee’s 85 State Natural Areas.

Geology
Most of the visible rocks in area belong to the Fort Payne Formation formed in the Mississippian period.

It is highly resistant to erosion, and acts as a caprock to hold up the escarpment between the Rim and the Central Basin to the northwest. Of the units described here, the Fort Payne is by far the most resistant to erosion and generally forms the steep valley walls along the incised streams

crops out along the margins of the Rim, particularly on the walls of incised Valleys. 
With a thickness of 

It consists of silicastone, with smaller amounts of calcareous siltstone and argillaceous limestone bands and nodules of dense chert.

In the incised stream valleys, this unit crops out at the base of the slopes and on the valley floor.

Biology
The Window Cliffs' flora was inventoried by Tennessee Tech in cooperation with Tennessee Department of Environment and Conservation (TDEC) in 2016. 

The best quality forest communities in the natural area consist of oak and hickory uplands with American beech and eastern hemlock in the coves.

The cliffs are one of only two known locations in Tennessee of the state-endangered species  plains muhly. It is a native grass that grows in clumps. It is commonly found on the shortgrass prairie habitat in the western plains of central Canada and the central United States.

 White cedar occurs at the base of the cliff. While rare in Tennessee, it occurs most often in eastern Canada and the northeastern U.S. 

Vestige of cooler and drier climate during the last ice age.

Access

Access to the Window Cliffs is by trail. The trailhead and parking area is located at the end of Old Cane Creek Road. The address is 8400 Old Cane Creek Road Baxter, Tennessee  The trail from the trailhead to the Window Cliffs is  each way. The trail fords Cane Creek ten times. Crossing is difficult or impossible during high water.

History
In the early 19th century, the French Naturalist, Charles Alexandre Lesueur, visited the area and named it "Cane Creek Bluff." His sketch of the feature is displayed in the Muséum d'Histoire Naturelle du Havre in Le Havre, France.
It was a large enough community to have a post office in the late 19th century.

It was featured in the story "Jack and the Mountain Pink" by Katherine Sherwood Bonner McDowell Harper’s Weekly, Jan. 29, 1881, 75-77

Travel Book

The Land Trust for Tennessee purchased this natural area from different private landowners in 2013, 2014 and 2015. The Land Trust then transferred the land the state of Tennessee. The site is managed by Burgess Falls State Natural Area/State Park. It officially opened to the public April 7, 2017.

See also
Burgess Falls
Ozone Falls State Natural Area
Cummins Falls State Park
Scott's Gulf

References

External links

Map of Window Cliffs State Natural Area at Tennessee state parks
 at YouTube

State parks of Tennessee
Protected areas of Putnam County, Tennessee
Waterfalls of Tennessee
Landforms of Putnam County, Tennessee